This was the first edition of the tournament.

Matteo Berrettini won the title after defeating Mikhail Kukushkin 3–6, 7–6(8–6), 7–6(7–2) in the final.

Seeds
All seeds receive a bye into the second round.

Draw

Finals

Top half

Section 1

Section 2

Bottom half

Section 3

Section 4

References

External links
Main draw
Qualifying draw

Arizona Tennis Classic - Singles
Sports competitions in Phoenix, Arizona